And One is a German synthpop group.

And 1, And I and similar may refer to:

Astronomy
Andromeda I, a dwarf spheroidal galaxy
1 And, another name for the star system Omicron Andromedae
ι And, another name for the star Iota Andromedae

Other uses
AND1, an American athletic shoe company
And-1, a three-point play in basketball
"And I", a song by Ciara
"And I", a song by Boyzone from their 1998 album Where We Belong

See also
 Andi (disambiguation)